The 2007–08 FIS Cross-Country World Cup Finals were the 1st edition of the FIS Cross-Country World Cup Finals, an annual cross-country skiing mini-tour event. The three-day event was held in Bormio, Italy. It began on 14 March 2008 and concluded on 16 March 2008. It was the final competition round of the 2007–08 FIS Cross-Country World Cup.

Pietro Piller Cottrer of Italy and Claudia Nystad of Germany won the first stage of the mini-tour; a prologue freestyle. The second stage, a mass start in classic technique, did not count as an ordinary World Cup race as no World Cup points were awarded on the stage. However, the stage counted in the World Cup Final overall standings and was won by Vincent Vittoz in the men's competition and by Virpi Kuitunen among the women. Vittoz and Kuitunen both lead the overall standings after two stages and both won the World Cup Final overall by defending their positions on the third stage.

Overall leadership

The results in the overall standings were calculated by adding each rider's finishing times on each stage. On the two first stages, the winners were awarded 15 bonus seconds. On the second stage, the three first skiers to pass the intermediate sprint points were also awarded bonus seconds. No bonus seconds were awarded on the third stage. The skier with the lowest cumulative time was the overall winner of the Cross-Country World Cup Finals.

Overall standings

Stages

Stage 1
14 March 2020
 Bonus seconds in finish: 15–10–5 to the 3 first skiers crossing the finish line.

Stage 2
15 March 2008
 Does not count as World Cup race as no World Cup points were awarded.

Stage 2 bonus seconds
 Men: 4 intermediate sprints, bonus seconds to the 3 first skiers (15–10–5) past the intermediate points.
 Women: 2 intermediate sprints, bonus seconds to the 3 first skiers (15–10–5) past the intermediate point.
 Bonus seconds in finish: 15–10–5 to the 3 first skiers crossing the finish line.

Stage 3
16 March 2019
The race for "Winner of the Day" did not receive 2007–08 FIS Cross-Country World Cup points. Therefore, pursuit results are presented. No bonus seconds were awarded on this stage.

World Cup points distribution
The overall winners are awarded 200 points. The winners of each of the first stage are awarded 100 points. The maximum number of points an athlete can earn is therefore 300 points.

References 

Finals
2008
2008 in cross-country skiing
Cross-country skiing competitions in Italy